Satpati (मराठी - सातपाटी) is a fishing village on the western coast of India, about 80 km north of Mumbai in the Palghar Taluka of District Palghar in Maharashtra. The main occupation in Satpati is fishing, with large exports abroad. The majority of the population are from the Koli community.

History
During Somnath Looting by Mohd. Gazanavi Somnath refugees took shelter in the 11th century by Gujarati Somnath Junagad Mali. Followed Maharashtrian customs instead Gujarati.

The most commonly spoken languages in Satpati are Mangeli and Vaity.

Transport links
The nearest railway station is Palghar (Western Railway), where State Transport (S.T.) buses are available for Satpati at regular intervals. 6/7-seater autorickshaws (that most of the time carry more than 10 people) also run between Satpati and Palghar on a regular basis.

Temples
Ram Mandir and Agni Mata are the most important temples in the village. Ram Mandir is situated at the entry point of the village while Agni mata is in the sea.

Festival
Many Festival like Dusshera, Diwali and Navratri are celebrated in this village, but there are two major festival that are celebrated with great enthusiasm, one is Holi and other is Ram Navami...!!

Let us know the importance of Holi festival :
According to the Holi legend, this festival conveys the message of victory of good over evil. The special feature of this festival is that on this day all the people forget their differences and come together to celebrate. In the same way all the villagers come together and burn Holika and pray to God that in the same way our sorrow, poverty, hated be burnt in this fire This is how we celebrated this festival with full of Joy....

Now let's us know about Ram Navami :
Ram Navami is one of the major festival in the village. In this village this festival is mainly celebrated on for 3 days. One these three day's a very big fair is held in the village. The fair started in the evening and lasted from 3 to 4 AM in the morning. On the first day i.e. On the day of Ram Navami is the temple of Rama just like 12 PM when Lord Shri Rama is Born, and the next day Lord Shri Rama's palanquin travels all over the village. When the palanquin moves around the village, the villagers shower flowers on the palanquin and dance to the sound of banjo. In this way the festival is celebrated with great enthusiasm and fervour...!!
 Villages in Palghar district
 Fishing in India
Women in Fisheries Series No.2